Thumbe is a village which is located in the Matara District, Southern Province, Sri Lanka. 

Thumbe has a population of 566 (as of 2015) a decline of 42.9% from 992 in 2000 and 875 in 1990.

It falls within the Kamburupitiya Polling Division in the Matara Electoral District. 

Thumbe is known for its woodworking artisans.

References

Populated places in Southern Province, Sri Lanka